South Kingsville is an inner-city suburb in Melbourne, Victoria, Australia,  south-west of Melbourne's Central Business District, located within the City of Hobsons Bay local government area.

The suburb is shaped as a right-angled triangle, bounded by New Street in the west, Blackshaws Road in the south, with the Newport-Sunshine railway line as a hypotenuse. Neighbouring suburbs include Newport, Yarraville, Altona North and Spotswood.

South Kingsville is approximately 10 minutes by car from Melbourne CBD via the West Gate Freeway and a 19-minute train journey using nearby Spotswood railway station.

History

Development in Spotswood and South Kingsville began around the mid 1800s. In the 1840s, John Stewart Spotswood purchased 119 acres and began a dairy farm. The area of South Kingsville was originally called the Birmingham Estate and was subdivided in the 1880s, although it did not fully develop until after World War II; Kingsville South Post Office opening on 2 February 1948 (closing in 1978). This area had been re-zoned multiple times, being initially part of the Shire of Wyndham, later renamed Werribee, then from 1941 part of the City of Footscray, and finally, from 1994, part of Hobsons Bay.

Transport

Bus
 Route 432: Newport to Yarraville (via Altona Gate Shopping Centre)

Today

At only 60 hectares, South Kingsville is the smallest suburb in the west of Melbourne.

Edwards Reserve in Brunel Street, South Kingsville, has one oval that is used for soccer and cricket. The reserve also has clubrooms, cricket nets, a basketball key, barbecue/picnic area and a children's playground.

The suburb is the home of the 5th Footscray Scout group, part of Scouts Australia – Kariwara District. The group meets in a private hall and is open to youth aged 6 to 26 years.

Vernon Street is the shopping strip of the suburb, also with Indian and Italian restaurants, and cafés. The street is also the location of Westgate Health Co-op, which is Australia's first-ever community medical co-operative. South Kingsville Community Centre is on nearby Paxton Street. providing a multitude of services to the community, such as: Pre School, Occasional Childcare Care facilities, Adult Education Courses, community activities and free access to computers and internet.

See also
 City of Footscray – South Kingsville was previously within this former local government area.

References

External links
Hobsons Bay Community Online Forum
 Secret suburbs are popping up all over the place (The Age, 3 October 2007)

Suburbs of Melbourne
Suburbs of the City of Hobsons Bay